Taftan (in Persian: تفتان Taftân) may refer to:

 Taftan (volcano), located in Sistan and Baluchestan province of Iran
 Taftan, Balochistan, a town in Balochistan province of Pakistan
 Taftan (bread), a leavened flour bread from Persian cuisine
 Taftan Airlines, is an Iranian airline
 Taftan-e Jonubi Rural District, a district in Iran